A Comrade's Honour is a 1953 Soviet drama film directed by Nikolay Lebedev and starring Konstantin Skorobogatov, Boris Kokovkin and Gennadiy Michurin.

Cast
 Konstantin Skorobogatov 
 Boris Kokovkin 
 Gennadiy Michurin 
 Vladimir Druzhnikov 
 Yuriy Tolubeev 
 Lev Frichinsky 
 Nina Grebeshkova 
 Vasiliy Merkurev 
 Klavdiya Khabarova

References

Bibliography 
 Rollberg, Peter. Historical Dictionary of Russian and Soviet Cinema. Scarecrow Press, 2008.

External links 
 

1953 drama films
1953 films
Soviet drama films
1950s Russian-language films